Pascal Renier (born 3 August 1971) is a former Belgian football defender.  His former clubs include Club Brugge and R.E. Mouscron. He also played for Troyes AC in French Ligue 1.

Renier was in the Belgium squad for the 1994 World Cup, albeit without playing.

References

External links
 
 

1971 births
Footballers from Liège Province
Belgian footballers
Belgian expatriate footballers
RFC Liège players
Standard Liège players
ES Troyes AC players
Expatriate footballers in France
Club Brugge KV players
Royal Excel Mouscron players
K.V.C. Westerlo players
S.V. Zulte Waregem players
Association football central defenders
Living people
1994 FIFA World Cup players
Belgium international footballers
Belgian Pro League players
Ligue 1 players
Association football defenders
People from Waremme